Atthipol Poolsap (Thai อิทธิพล พูลทรัพย์, born April 8, 1984), simply known as Tor, or Ittipol Poolsap is a retired professional footballer from Thailand.

International goals

Honours

Club
TTM Phichit F.C.
 Thai League 1 Champions (1) : 2004
 Kor Royal Cup winner (1) : 2005

International
Thailand U-23
 Sea Games  Gold Medal (1); 2007

External links
 

1984 births
Living people
Atthipol Poolsap
Atthipol Poolsap
Association football midfielders
Atthipol Poolsap
Atthipol Poolsap
Atthipol Poolsap
Atthipol Poolsap
Atthipol Poolsap
Atthipol Poolsap
Atthipol Poolsap
Southeast Asian Games medalists in football
Atthipol Poolsap
Competitors at the 2007 Southeast Asian Games